BBC Studios is a British content company. It is a commercial subsidiary of the BBC that was formed in April 2018 through the merger of the BBC's commercial production arm and the BBC's commercial international distribution arm, BBC Worldwide.

Overview
BBC Studios Productions brings together the majority of BBC Television's former in-house production departments; Factual, Drama, Comedy, (both combined as Scripted in the new division), Entertainment, and Music & Events. BBC Children's production is set to move into BBC Studios Productions from April 2022 to increase the potential of taking British children's content to the wider global market, along with BBC Three's in-house production team, which is joining from April 2021.

BBC News and BBC Radio remain separate internal production divisions in the BBC (although BBC Radio Comedy is part of BBC Studios), and the rest of the former BBC Television division (channels and genre commissioning, including BBC Sport and BBC iPlayer) are part of the BBC Content division.

The BBC Studios production division was formed in 2016 and launched as a commercial entity in 2017, enabling it to produce programming for other broadcasters and services to generate profit to return to the BBC to supplement licence fee income. In exchange, the BBC agreed to place production of much of its non-news programmes to tender, allowing third-party independents to compete with BBC Studios on bids to produce them.

The merger of BBC Studios and BBC Worldwide in 2018, brought the company in line with other major multinational studio conglomerates.

BBC Studios Productions was the UK's most commissioned creator of new content in 2019, with 77 new commissions from the BBC and third-parties. It achieved 73 awards and 202 nominations in 2019/2020.

BBC Studios represents formats and programmes made by hundreds of independent producers, as well as its own production teams and returned £176m to the independent sector in 2018/2019.

The company is on track to meet its five-year target of returning £1.2bn to the BBC by 2021/2022. BBC Studios has committed to growing this total by a further 30% to a new target of £1.5bn in the five years from 2022/2023.

History
BBC Studios Ltd. as a production company was first registered on 27 February 2015. In September 2015, the BBC's general director Tony Hall announced a proposal to split the BBC's in-house production units for non-news television programming into a separate BBC Studios division, which would eventually, with BBC Trust approval as part of the next revision to the BBC's charter, be spun-out as a for-profit subsidiary of the BBC. This proposal would allow the BBC's units to produce programmes for other broadcasters and digital outlets (which could be done in conjunction with its international distribution arm BBC Worldwide) in addition to the BBC's publicly funded properties. As a for-profit company, BBC Studios would be allowed to pay higher wages to its executives and talent, and no longer face scrutiny over them as it did as a public entity. The proposal was described by The Guardian as being "one of the biggest changes to the BBC in its 93-year history".

The proposal attracted criticism from independent studios, who felt that it would result in the formation of a "super-indie" that would unduly benefit from "guaranteed" programme commissions from the BBC. As part of the split, the BBC planned to tender its programmes, so that independent producers and BBC Studios could bid for the rights to produce its non-news programming, outside of top shows (such as Doctor Who) assigned to BBC Studios. The re-organisation and formation of BBC Studios as a division of the BBC was completed in April 2016. In September 2016, the BBC announced that it would tender its non-news programmes over the next 11 years, beginning with programmes such as A Question of Sport, Holby City and Songs of Praise.

In October 2016, the BBC announced that it planned to lay off 300 employees from the division seen as redundant. In December 2016, BBC Studios announced that it had reached an agreement with Producers Alliance for Cinema and Television (PACT) in regards to the tendering plan, stating that it would tender at least 40% of the "in-house guarantee" within two years of approval of the transition. The BBC Trust subsequently approved the creation of BBC Studios as a commercial subsidiary, with the process expected to be completed in April 2017.

On 29 November 2017, the BBC announced that BBC Worldwide would be merged into BBC Studios effective 1 April 2018. The BBC stated that by handling both the production and sales of its programming within one unit, it would improve efficiency and be in line with the "global norms" of other major international media companies. Technically, BBC Ventures Group Ltd. was renamed BBC Studios Group Ltd. on 3 April 2018, and then BBC Studios Ltd. 1 October 2018; also in October, the production company established in 2015 was renamed BBC Studios Productions Ltd., and so did BBC Worldwide Ltd., which was renamed BBC Studios Distribution Ltd.

In April 2019, BBC Studios announced various agreements with Discovery, Inc.; the companies agreed to break apart their UKTV joint venture, with Discovery (which had acquired a stake in UKTV after its purchase of Scripps Networks Interactive) acquiring the BBC's stake in UKTV's lifestyle channels, and BBC Studios likewise acquiring Discovery's stakes in UKTV's entertainment channels and the video on-demand service UKTV Play. In addition, Discovery announced a 10-year agreement with the BBC's Natural History Unit to acquire exclusive subscription video-on-demand rights to its content worldwide (which would be incorporated into a forthcoming global streaming brand), and co-fund a development team. Discovery had previously served as the Natural History's Unit U.S. partner until 2013.

In August 2019 BBC Studios announced a long-term deal with WarnerMedia's upcoming HBO Max for streaming rights to past seasons of top BBC programmes such as Doctor Who, The Honourable Woman, Luther, and Top Gear. In January 2020, it also sold second-window streaming rights to 14 series to CW Seed (a video on-demand platform operated by The CW, a television network co-owned by WarnerMedia).

In November 2020, BBC Studios 2019/2020 UK Pay Gap Report was published, which showed that all median pay gaps were now below 10% and that women made up 53.2% of leadership roles.  The report also voluntarily disclosed BBC Studios bonus pay gaps by ethnicity, disability and sexuality for the first time, as well as more detail on the three payment types that make up BBC Studios' overall bonus pay gaps.
 
In November 2020, BBC Studios Productions announced it was introducing new steps to improve diversity and inclusion across its content and teams, including an ‘Inclusion Rider’, spearheaded by Director of Content Ralph Lee. This sees a commitment to a minimum target of 20% of on-screen talent and production teams on all new BBC and third-party UK commissions coming from a Black, Asian, Minority Ethnic (BAME) background, having a lived experience of a disability, or being from a low-income background. There was also an additional commitment to a target of at least one senior role on scripted and unscripted production teams being appointed from one of these backgrounds.
  
In February 2021, BBC Studios launched a new streaming brand in North America known as BBC Select, dedicated to factual content. On 22 February 2021, BBC Studios signed a first-look deal with Gobstopper Group.

In March 2021 it was announced that the BBC Children's Productions and BBC Global News units would also be transferred into BBC Studios. With the change, BBC Studios will handle international distribution and advertising sales for BBC World News, while the public service BBC News operation will assume editorial control of the channel. More recently, the studio had set up a development deal with EbonyLife Media, which was affiliated with Sony Pictures Television, headed by Mo Abudu.

In August 2022 it was revealed that BBC Studios planned to launch an international newsletter business, initially focusing on Canada and the US, the BBC's second largest non-UK news market behind India.

Assets and brands

Television channels 

 BBC America (United States)
 BBC Brit
 BBC Earth
BBC Earth (Canada; Under license) 
Sony BBC Earth (India; joint venture with Sony)
 BBC Entertainment
 BBC First
 BBC First (Australia)
 BBC First (Canada; Under license)
 BBC First (Netherlands)
 BBC HD
 BBC Kids
 BBC Lifestyle
 BBC UKTV (Australia and New Zealand)
 UKTV
 Alibi
 Dave
 Drama
 Eden
 Gold
 W
 Yesterday

Brands
 BBC Shop - Online retailer operating in the US & Canada only, selling BBC products. UK physical store closed in 2016 & BBC Store closed in 2017, although Studios retain Doctor Who and Top Gear branded online shops.
 BBC Motion Gallery - Licensing footage from the BBC Archives
 BBC Studios Home Entertainment - Video and music publisher for BBC content. Formerly known as 2 | entertain.
 Demon Music Group - Record label.
 UKTV - UK digital TV broadcaster.
 BBC Player (not to be confused with BBC iPlayer) - A video on demand subscription service in Singapore and Malaysia.
 Rapid Blue - Division of BBC Studios responsible for production in South Africa.
 BBC Active (joint venture with Pearson PLC) - The brand publishes educational material.
 Licences the publishing of magazine titles to the Immediate Media Company. The titles were formerly published in-house by BBC Magazines.
 Licences audio content to Penguin Random House UK for global sales and distribution. Titles were previously published in-house by BBC Radio Collection and BBC Audiobooks and later by AudioGO, in which BBC Studios held a 15% stake.
 BBC Books (joint venture with Penguin Random House UK
 BBC Children's Books (joint venture with Penguin Random House UK)

Label investments
BBC Studios has built up a stake in a variety of different production companies. 
72 Films (with David Glover and Mark Raphael; 15%)
Amazing Productions (with George Clarke, 25%) 
Baby Cow Productions (with Steve Coogan; 73%)  
Burning Bright Productions (25%)
Clerkenwell Films (100% as of 19 January 2021)
Cuba Pictures (10%, via Original Talent Ltd)
Curve Media (with Rob Carey and Camilla Lewis; 25%)
Expectation Entertainment (24.9%)
Firebird Pictures (100% as of 5 October 2022)
House Productions (100% as of 14 December 2021)
Lookout Point TV (51%)
Mighty Productions (with Lynn Sutcliffe and Hugh Rycroft)
Moonage Pictures
Sid Gentle Films Ltd. (100% as of 17 October 2022)
VAL (Various Artists Limited) (with Sam Bain, Jesse Armstrong, Phil Clarke and Roberto Troni; 20%)

BBC Records

BBC Records was a division of the BBC founded in 1967 to commercially exploit the corporation's output for radio and television for both educational and domestic use. In the 1990s licensing and marketing of the BBC's recorded output become the responsibility of BBC Worldwide (formerly BBC Enterprises), and the corporation ceased the direct release of recorded material, instead licensing its products to other companies. BBC Worldwide was merged into BBC Studios from 2018, which now licenses the use of the BBC logo on commercial recordings.

BritBox

BritBox is an over-the-top subscription video on-demand brand, which includes original programming commissioned or acquired by the company, and third-party content licensed from other UK channels such as BBC, ITV, Channel 4 & Channel 5. Announced by BBC Worldwide & ITV plc as a joint venture back in 2016 & launched in 2017, it is now a fully owned subsidiary of ITV, after they announced in 2022 that they had bought out the BBC & its other partners with the intention of integrating the service with ITVX.

Notes

References

External links
 
 BBC Studios Ltd. (the holding company) at Companies House
 BBC Studios Productions Ltd. (formerly BBC Studios Ltd.) at Companies House

Studios
Local mass media in London
Television production companies of the United Kingdom
Mass media companies established in 2015